Sanford may refer to:

People 
Sanford (given name), including a list of people with the name
Sanford (surname), including a list of people with the name

Places

United States
 Sanford, Alabama, a town in Covington County
 Sanford, Colorado, a statutory town in Conejos County
 Sanford, Florida, the county seat of Seminole County
 Orlando Sanford International Airport, in Sanford, Florida
 Sanford, Georgia, an unincorporated community
 Sanford, Kansas, an unincorporated community in Pawnee County
 Sanford, Maine, a city in York County
 Sanford (CDP), Maine, a former census-designated place in downtown Sanford 
 Sanford, Michigan, a village in Midland County
 Sanford, Mississippi, an unincorporated community in Covington County
 Sanford, New York, a town in Broome County
 Sanford, North Carolina, a city in Lee County
 Sanford, Texas, a town in Hutchinson County
 Sanford, Virginia, a census-designated place in Accomack County
 Mount Sanford (Alaska), a shield volcano in the Wrangell Volcanic Field
 Sanford Stadium, Athens, Georgia, football venue at the University of Georgia

Canada
 Sanford, Manitoba, an unincorporated community in Macdonald rural municipality

United Kingdom
 Sanford Housing Co-operative, a housing cooperative in London

Moon
 Sanford (crater), a lunar impact crater on the Moon's far side

Science
 Sanford's bowerbird (Archboldia sanfordi), a bird species in Papua New Guinea
 Sanford's brown lemur (Eulemur sanfordi), a primate species in Madagascar
 Sanford's sea eagle (Haliaeetus sanfordi), a bird species endemic to the Solomon Islands
 Sanford's white-eye (Woodfordia lacertosa), a species of bird endemic to the Solomon Islands

Other uses 
 Sanford (TV series), a 1980–81 American TV series, a revival of Sanford and Son
 Sanford Health, a health-care system based in Sioux Falls, South Dakota, United States
 Sanford L.P., a unit of Newell Rubbermaid that manufactures writing products
 Sanford's Opera Troupe, an American blackface minstrel troupe, 1853–1857

See also 
 Sanford station (disambiguation)
 Sandford (disambiguation)
 Samford (disambiguation)
 Stanford (disambiguation)